The 2016 Individual Long Track/Grasstrack World Championship was the 46th edition of the FIM speedway Individual Long Track World Championship.

The world title was won by Erik Riss of Germany for the second time.

Venues

Final Classification

References 

2016
Speedway competitions in France
Speedway competitions in Germany
Speedway competitions in the Netherlands
Speedway competitions in Finland
Long
2016 in Dutch motorsport
2016 in German motorsport
2016 in French motorsport
2016 in Finnish sport